HMS Zetland was a Royal Navy Type II  , named after the Zetland Hunt.

Built by Yarrow Shipbuilders, Glasgow and launched on 7 March 1942. She was commissioned on 27 June 1942 with the pennant number L59.  Zetland was given to the Royal Norwegian Navy and commissioned as HNoMS Tromsø. She was sold for breaking up in 1965.

Construction
HMS Zetland was ordered from Yarrows on 20 December 1939, one of 16 Type II Hunt-class destroyers ordered from various shipbuilders on that date, (including two from Yarrows). The Hunts were meant to fill the Royal Navy's need for a large number of small destroyer-type vessels capable of both convoy escort and operations with the fleet. The Type II Hunts differed from the earlier ships in having increased beam in order to improve stability and carry the ships' originally intended armament.

Zetland was laid down at Yarrow's Scotstoun, Glasgow shipyard on 2 October 1940, was launched on 15 January 1942 and completed on 7 May 1942.

Displacement was  standard and   under full load.

The ship's main gun armament was six 4 inch (102 mm) QF Mk XVI dual purpose (anti-ship and anti-aircraft) guns in three twin mounts, with one mount forward and two aft. Additional close-in anti-aircraft armament was provided by a quadruple 2-pounder "pom-pom" mount and two single Oerlikon 20 mm cannon mounted in the bridge wings. Power-operated twin  Oerlikon mounts replaced the single Oerlikons during the war. Up to 110 depth charges could be carried. The ship had a complement of 168 officers and men.

Second World War service
During the Second World War, Zetland saw service in the Atlantic (1942–43), Malta Convoys (1942), north Africa (1942–43), Mediterranean (1943–44), Aegean (1944), Adriatic (1944) and Operation Dragoon, the landings in southern France in 1944.

Air Raid on Bari
Zetland was one of two Hunt-class destroyers that were damaged in the air raid on Bari on 2 December 1943. An ammunition ship was hit and exploded, spreading her cargo of mustard gas over the harbour and town. Zetland was near-missed by a German bomb, and subject to blast and fragment damage from the explosion of two nearby merchant ships. Zetlands sister ship,  was damaged more seriously. Zetland towed Bicester to Taranto for repairs. There were so many mustard gas casualties that, on arrival in Taranto, the ships had to ask for assistance to enter the harbour as all navigating officers had their vision impaired by this chemical weapon.

Postwar service
Between June and October 1945 Zetland was in refit in Alexandria, before returning to the UK. On 20 April 1946 she paid off into reserve and was assigned to the Solent Division Royal Naval Volunteer Reserve (RNVR) as a drill ship. On 2 September 1954 she was lent to Norway. She was broken up in 1965 at Sarpsborg shipbreakers.

References

Publications

External links
 H.M.S. ZETLAND L59
 HMS ZETLAND - Type II, Hunt-class Escort Destroyer

 

1942 ships
Ships built on the River Clyde
Hunt-class destroyers of the Royal Navy
Hunt-class destroyers of the Royal Norwegian Navy
World War II destroyers of the United Kingdom